Stanislav Goldberg is an Estonian football player who plays as a midfielder for Estonian club Kohtla-Järve JK Järve.

References

External links

1992 births
Living people
Association football midfielders
Estonian footballers
Estonian Jews
Paide Linnameeskond players
FC Elva players
FC Flora players
FC Warrior Valga players
Seinäjoen Jalkapallokerho players
Nõmme Kalju FC players
SJK Akatemia players
FC Viljandi players
F.C. Ashdod players
Hapoel Ashdod F.C. players
Ida-Virumaa FC Alliance players
Estonian expatriate footballers
Expatriate footballers in Finland
Expatriate footballers in Israel
Expatriate soccer players in Australia
Estonian expatriate sportspeople in Finland
Estonian expatriate sportspeople in Israel
Estonian expatriate sportspeople in Australia
Tallinna JK Legion players
JK Tarvas Rakvere players